The Afghan Museum (German: Afghanisches Museum) was private museum of culture and cultural history of Afghanistan, situated in the historic and picturesque Speicherstadt (warehouse district) of Hamburg, Germany. The museum's mandate was to bring the authentic and traditional aspects of Afghan culture to life.

History 
This private museum was opened in March 1998 by lawyer and businessman Nek Mohamad Pirzad, his family and friends and was closed in December 2011

Interior and contents 
The artistic design for the museum was led by Mr. Hessan, an Afghan artist living in Germany. The museum housed displays how a cobbler repairs worn out shoes, tandoori bread is baked, a carpet-maker ties knots for a large Afghan carpet with the famous Elephantfoot pattern. Exhibitions displayed a look inside a tea house and a Turkmen tent called yurt, or under an Afghan veil (chadri). Reproductions of the great fortress of Bost, Qala-e-Bost, in Lashkar Gah, the big Buddhas of Bamyan, and the minaret of Jam are represented.

The store offered green tea flavoured with cardamom, roasted chick peas, raisins, mulberries, Afghan jewellery and clothes were sold.

Visitors 
The museum took part in the Long Night of Museums of Hamburg.

See also 
 Kabul Museum
 List of museums and cultural institutions in Hamburg

References

External links 
  

Museums established in 1998
Buildings and structures in Hamburg-Mitte
Museums in Hamburg
History museums in Germany
Historiography of Afghanistan